The 1932–33 Panhellenic Championship was the fifth season of the highest football league of Greece.  It was held in two groups, the Southern and the Northern.

The Southern Group was formed by 5 teams which resulted as follows:
Athenian Association: The 3 teams qualified in the previous season.
Piraeus' Association: The 2 teams qualified in the previous season.

The Northern Group was formed by 3 teams which resulted as follows:
Macedonian Association: The 3 teams qualified in the previous season.

These teams did not participate in the local championships and their stay in the national division was judged by ranking matches. Finally, the teams that participated in the final phase of the championship resulted as follows:
Southern Group: The first 2 teams of the ranking.
Northern Group: The winner.

Olympiacos won its 2nd championship and its 1st undefeated. The point system was: Win: 2 points - Draw: 1 point - Loss: 0 points. Panathinaikos finished last and was relegated. Finally, in September 1933, the rules changed, and with the abolition of the national category, Panathinaikos took part in the next national championship.

Semi-final Round

Southern Group

Northern Group

Final Round

League table

Top scorers

References

External links
Rsssf 1932–33 championship

Panhellenic Championship seasons
Greece
1